Muthuvijayapuram is a small village/hamlet located in Mudukulathur Block Ramanathapuram district of Tamil Nadu state in India.  .It comes under Pirabakaloor Panchayat. It's located 25 km towards west from District headquarters Ramanathapuram.525 km from State capital chennai

Life in Village
Village life is full of contentment and happiness. The beauty of nature can be experienced in a village as it is surrounded by Trees,Flowers and farmlands.There is no pollution in the village and once can feel the freshness in the breeze.And also Clean drinking water, electricity,Schools and proper sanitation are few facilities that are lacking in village.St Thoma Youth CLub (YTC) is organized by Youths of this village with Guidance of elder Peoples in Village.

Agriculture 
Most people in this village are farmers. They grow Rice, vegetables, Cotton & Chili pepper

Geography
Tamil is the local language here and it's located at 9° 23'43.3494" N 78° 37"35.5758".

Transport
Muthuvijayapuram is well connected by bus from Paramakudi and Mudukulathur. Nearest Railway station is 18 km to paramakudi

Festivals
The St. Thomas Church Festival is celebrated every year in April, seven days after Easter. As well as Christmas and Easter too.

School and library
There is an elementary English school in village (RC School), and a Sacred Heart Higher Secondary School in Thiruvarangam 3 km from the village. There is also a public library in village.

St Thomas Church

References 
Blog

External links 
 Blog

Villages in Ramanathapuram district